The 2016–17 ASUN Conference men's basketball season began with practices in October 2016, followed by the start of the 2016–17 NCAA Division I men's basketball season in November. Conference play began on January 24, 2017 and concluded on February 23, 2017. The season marked the 39th season of ASUN Conference basketball, and also the first under the conference's current branding with the ASUN name.

Florida Gulf Coast won the regular season championship by one game over Lipscomb. The ASUN tournament was held from February 27 through March 5 at campus sites as top seeds hosted each round. Florida Gulf Coast defeated North Florida in the championship game to win the tournament championship. As a result, Florida Gulf Coast received the conference's automatic bid to the NCAA tournament.

North Florida's Dallas Moore was named conference player of the year. Florida Gulf Coast’s head coach Joe Dooley was named conference coach of the year.

In addition to Florida Gulf Coast's invitation to the NCAA Tournament, USC Upstate and Jacksonville were invited to the CollegeInsider.com Postseason Tournament.

Conference matrix

Points scored

Conference regular season

Through February 23, 2017

All-ASUN Awards
Source

Postseason

References